Stadion Albert Flórián was a sports stadium in Budapest, Hungary. The stadium was the home of the association football club Ferencvárosi TC. The stadium had a capacity of 18,100. Formerly known as Üllői úti stadion for its location, it had been renamed for Ballon d'Or winner club legend Flórián Albert in 2007. Today, the stadium's place is occupied by the newly built Groupama Arena.

History

Construction
The first stadium was started to be built in the autumn of 1910. On 12 February 1911, Ferencváros played their first match against Budapest rival MTK Budapest which was won by the club. The starting line-up consisted of Fritz, Rumbold, Magnlitz, Weinber, Bródy, Payer, Szeitler, Weisz, Koródy, Schlosser, Borbás. The first stadium could host 40,000 spectators.

First reconstruction
In 1971 the stands were demolished and a new stadium was started to be built. The new stadium was inaugurated on the 75th anniversary of the club. On 19 May 1974, the first match was played against the Vasas old boys. The new stadium could host 29,505 spectators (including 10 771 seats and 18 734 standing). In the 1990s the stadium was redesigned to meet the UEFA requirements therefore its capacity was reduced to 18 100.

On 21 December 2007, the stadium was changed from Üllői úti Stadion to Stadion Albert Flórián. Flórián Albert, the former Ferencváros icon, was present at the inauguration ceremony.

Milestone matches

First era (1911-1971)
First match: Ferencváros 2-1  MTK Budapest FC
First UEFA match: Ferencváros 2-1  Rangers F.C. (UEFA Cup Winners' Cup 1960-61)
Last UEFA match: Ferencváros 1-1  Liverpool F.C. (Inter-Cities Fairs Cup 1970-71)

Second era (1974-2013)

International matches

Record

Photo gallery

References

External links

Stadium Albert Flórián at magyarfutball.hu
New Albert Stadium at magyarfutball.hu

Albert
Sports venues in Budapest